
Schill is a surname. Notable people with the surname include:

 a nickname for Curt Schilling (b. 1966), American baseball player
 Eleanor Schill (1904–2005), one of the first female medical doctors in England
 Ferdinand von Schill (1776–1809), Prussian soldier
 Kurt Schill (1911–1944), German communist and a resistance fighter
 Lambert Schill (1888–1976), German politician
 Michael H. Schill (b. 1958), American university president
 Otto Schill (1838–1918), German jurist
 Rachel Schill (b. 1982), Canadian softball player
 Ronald Schill (b. 1958), German ex-politician, retired judge

Companies 
Schill Malz, German sites of GrainCorp

See also
 Party for a Rule of Law Offensive, a former German political party whose short name on ballots was "Schill" (for its leader Ronald Schill)